The Hendrix Set is a live EP by two time Grammy nominee Paul Rodgers of Free and Bad Company fame. Released 2 November 1993, The Hendrix Set consists of covers of five of Jimi Hendrix's  songs. It was recorded live at Bayfront Park in Miami, Florida on 4 July 1993. The EP features Neal Schon of Journey on guitar, as well as future Journey members Deen Castronovo and Todd Jensen.

Track listing
"Purple Haze"
"Stone Free"
"Little Wing"
"Manic Depression"
"Foxy Lady"

Personnel

Paul Rodgers and Company
 Paul Rodgers – vocals
 Neal Schon – guitar
 Todd Jensen – bass
 Deen Castronovo – drums

Technical
 Paul Rodgers, Neal Schon – producers
 Steve Croxford – production manager
 Craig Schertz, Lee Baird – engineers
 Stephen Marcussen – mastering
 Harry Zontal – mixing engineer
 Karl Kristkeitz – art direction
 Mike Guzzeta – photography
 Rob Belcher – band technician

References

1993 debut EPs
Paul Rodgers albums
Jimi Hendrix tribute albums
1993 live albums
Live EPs